Claude Percival Buckenham (16 January 1876 – 23 February 1937) was an English first-class cricketer who played for Essex and England. He also won a gold medal playing football at the Olympic Games in 1900.

Life and career
Tall and gangling, and with a distinctive moustache, Percy Buckenham was a fast bowler and a useful lower order batsman. He played for Essex from 1899 to 1914, but suffered, particularly in his early years, from slipshod fielding which meant, according to his obituary in Wisden Cricketers' Almanack, he was more expensive than he perhaps deserved. His career average, at more than 25, is high for the era in which he played.

The 1906 season was the first in which he took more than 100 wickets, and he played several representative matches over the next few English seasons without breaking into the Test match team in England. He was picked in the squad for the fifth Test at The Oval against the 1909 Australians, but was then left out of the team: his omission was described by Sydney Pardon, editor of Wisden, as "a fatal blunder" and the selectors' decision not to include a fast bowler at all "touched the confines of lunacy".

Buckenham's only Test experience came on the 1909-10 tour to South Africa, under the captaincy of H. D. G. Leveson Gower. In four Tests, he took 21 wickets at 28 runs apiece, including five for 115 in the first South African innings of the third Test at Johannesburg. But though he had his most productive season in 1911, with 134 first-class wickets, he was considered too old for the 1911-12 tour to Australia.

Buckenham was a good amateur footballer and played county soccer for Essex. He played right-back for the Upton Park F.C. team that won the inaugural Olympic football tournament in 1900. He is one of only four Test cricketers to compete at the Olympic Games.

Buckenham retired from first-class cricket in 1914 to become professional at the Scottish club Forfarshire. After serving with the Royal Garrison Artillery in the First World War he became cricket coach at Repton School.

References

 Buchanan, Ian  British Olympians. Guinness Publishing (1991)

External links

1876 births
1937 deaths
Military personnel from London
England Test cricketers
English cricketers
English Olympic medallists
Essex cricketers
English footballers
Olympic footballers of Great Britain
Footballers at the 1900 Summer Olympics
Olympic gold medallists for Great Britain
People from Herne Hill
Footballers from the London Borough of Lambeth
Upton Park F.C. players
Olympic medalists in football
Marylebone Cricket Club cricketers
North v South cricketers
Players cricketers
East of England cricketers
Medalists at the 1900 Summer Olympics
Association football fullbacks
Royal Garrison Artillery soldiers
Cricketers from Greater London
S. H. Cochrane's XI cricketers
L. G. Robinson's XI cricketers
Lord Londesborough's XI cricketers
P. F. Warner's XI cricketers
British Army personnel of World War I
Marylebone Cricket Club South African Touring Team cricketers